"When You Were Mine" is a song written and released by Prince on his 1980 album, Dirty Mind. Though not released as a single, the song received a promotional 12" release (which included "Gotta Broken Heart Again" and "Uptown"). "When You Were Mine" was later the B-side for Prince's "Controversy" single in 1981.

Prince performed the song many times in concert, and a live version was included on his 2002 live album, One Nite Alone... Live! The original studio version was also included on The Hits/The B-Sides in 1993. Prince said he was inspired to write the rock song while listening to John Lennon. The track includes a Farfisa-inspired organ sound played on an Oberheim OB-X.

Cyndi Lauper version

Cyndi Lauper's mid-tempo ballad cover version of "When You Were Mine" is also synthesizer-based for her 1983 debut album, She's So Unusual. She performed the single at the 1985 American Music Awards. It was released exclusively as a promotional single in the United States and received a commercial release in Canada and Japan.

Track listing

Canada 7" single
 "When You Were Mine" (Single Version) – 4:00
 "Yeah Yeah" – 3:17

Japan 7" single
 "When You Were Mine"
 "I'll Kiss You"

Charts

References

1980 songs
1983 singles
1985 singles
Prince (musician) songs
Cyndi Lauper songs
Mitch Ryder songs
Songs written by Prince (musician)
Song recordings produced by Prince (musician)
Song recordings produced by Rick Chertoff
Epic Records singles
American new wave songs
American power pop songs
Jangle pop songs